The Bryant Range is a range of low mountains in the northern South Island of New Zealand.

The Bryant Range runs roughly northeast to southwest for some 35 kilometres, starting south of Delaware Bay and extending to its junction with the larger Richmond Range south of the town of Richmond. It is bounded in the east by the valleys of the Pelorus, Rai, and Ronga Rivers, and in the west by the Whangamoa River, Roding, and Teal Rivers. The range has several peaks over 1000 metres in height, notably Saddle Hill (1215m) and Mount Duppa (1133m).

References

Mountain ranges of New Zealand
Landforms of the Nelson Region
Landforms of the Marlborough Region